King Square Mall (王府井) is a Chinese commercial center, named after the world-famous merchandise King Square Street in Beijing. It is located at the edge of a residential area and northwest of 16th Avenue and Woodbine Avenue. The project is expected to become one of the largest Asian shopping mall in North America with a square footage of over one million.

References

External links
Official website

Shopping malls in the Regional Municipality of York
Buildings and structures in Markham, Ontario